The John Fisher School is a Roman Catholic voluntary-aided boys' faith school based at Peaks Hill, Purley, Croydon, Surrey, England. The school is located in and funded by the London Borough of Sutton. It occupies the former site of the 19th-century prep school Falconbury School.
The school operates as a local standard Roman Catholic Comprehensive School, educating boys mainly from around South and Central Croydon. It has a history of selection, and (as a selective entry grant-maintained school, and before that as a fee-paying boys’ grammar school) has drawn pupils from across London and South East England.

The school has operated selective admissions policies twice in its history, from when it was founded in 1929 until 1977, and more recently from 1991 to 2008. It was, alongside the London Oratory School, one of the last selective entry Catholic comprehensive schools to defy the Schools' Admissions Code by continuing to interview prospective pupils and their parents. There have been no parental interviews since 2008, with the final cohort of boys selected by interview leaving the school in the Summer of 2014.

The school has grown since the end of its selection policy from 700 pupils to over 1000, and was set to grow even more beginning in 2016 (30 additional places).

History
The John Fisher School was founded by Peter Emmanuel Amigo, Archbishop of Southwark, in 1929 at Duppas Hill in Croydon, and moved in 1931 to its current premises in Peaks Hill, Purley. It is the only currently-open school named after Saint John Fisher that was founded before his canonization in 1935. This is indicated by the absence of "Saint" from the school name. At the start of the 1970s the John Fisher School was a diocesan grammar school with an intake of fee-paying and non-fee-paying children. It had a small number of boarders until 1970 when a decision was made to end this facility. In 1977 it became an all-ability comprehensive school maintained by the London Borough of Sutton. 

In 1991, following discussion and a vote by parents, John Fisher was incorporated as a Grant Maintained School and operated a selection policy. Selection into the school was via an interview process involving candidates and their parents (to assess whether the boy and his family's ambitions and ethos were in harmony of those of the school) or by examination (for a minority of academic places). Also, a small number of young men were selected on the basis of musical ability or for sporting promise. 

Despite the school selecting all of its pupils it was nominally comprehensive because not all boys were selected purely on academic ability. GM Catholic schools that examined candidates and interviewed potential pupils and their parents were often controversial. In September 2008, the school stopped all forms of selection and became a local voluntary-aided comprehensive school, serving Croydon and Sutton, once more. In 2003, John Fisher School became a specialist sports college and construction began on a £1.2 million sports hall opened by Sir Bobby Robson.

Since the end of its selective admissions process the school has come under fire for "its controversial points admission system which favours children from families who are the most active in the church." The school was investigated by the Office of the Schools Adjudicator (OSA) after complaints from a parent. Objections to the OSA included "governors could manipulate what was considered a bona fide parish activity to 'exclude those they do not wish to admit from the school'" and "that governors were using surnames to reject single parents".
The OSA did not endorse the latter claim but made "the strongest recommendation" that the current system be scrapped. This is the second time the school's admission policy has been investigated by the OSA following complaints.

In March 2022 the children's author Simon James Green  was invited to speak at the school as part of "World Book Day and LGBTQ+ History Month celebrations". The intended audience of boys in years 8 and 9 were encouraged to purchase his books as part of a book signing event. This generated some criticism from those who felt that the content of Mr. Green's books was contrary to Catholic teaching on healthy relationships and the meaning of human sexuality and that the event should be cancelled. Some parents also objected to the graphic sexual content of the books which they considered to be unsuitable for their children and also to a profane parody of the Lord's Prayer. These views were reiterated by The Catholic Archdiocese of Southwark,  which instructed the school to withdraw the invitation and subsequently dismissed the foundation governors who disagreed with this action. Concerns over the school's governance in this matter triggered a snap Ofsted inspection, which reported that the archdiocese had acted unilaterally and without regard to statutory guidance. Ofsted said that as a priority, "immediate steps must be taken to restore stability to governance, and in turn ensure that leadership is provided". The Archdiocese appointed seven new Foundation Governors to replace those who had either been removed or resigned. Six days of strike action by members of the National Education Union were announced in protest at the archdiocese's actions.

In recent years, due to tightening up in the schools' admissions code and the abolition of first preference first criteria, the school has developed and expanded to become more of a standard non-selective local Roman Catholic boys' comprehensive school, mainly serving the areas of South & Central Croydon, North Surrey, Bromley and Sutton.

Description

Admissions at 11+
Boys are admitted to the school at the ages of 11 or 16. Entry at 11+ is non-selective (since September 2008). Since 2013 for the first time in its history, and like all other state schools, the school now admits boys who either fail or fail to score highly enough to gain a place at one of the few London grammar schools. Approximately 190 boys are admitted in Year 7.

John Fisher was a small selective school from 1991 until September 2008. During the school's selection policy (when there was no consideration for boys living closest to the school whatsoever) it was taking boys from 20 to 30 miles away, but, due to its highly selective nature and high academic attainment, it was seen by many parents as an alternative to independent schools.

The assessment consisted of a candidate and parent interview, a religion test, a written statement by the boy stating why he would like to attend the school and a report from the boy's current school. A smaller number of boys were selected for academic, musical and sports aptitude, in conjunction with an interview. There have been no interviews since 2008.

Academic results

5 GCSE A*-C
Exam results:

 2014-83.11% (76% inc Eng & Mat)
 2013-95% (87% inc Eng & Mat)
 2012-93.2% (79% inc Eng & Mat)
 2011-88% (73% inc Eng & Mat)
 2010-84% (72% inc Eng & Mat)
 2009-85% (73% inc Eng & Mat)

Headmasters
Prior to Terence King's appointment all headmasters were Roman Catholic priests. 
 1981–1993 – Terence King
 1993–2005 – Robin Gregory
 2005–2006 – Pat Liddiard
 2006–2015 – Mark Scully
 2015–present – Philip McCullagh

Sporting results

Rugby Union
The 7s team reached three consecutive national finals between 1997 and 1999 winning two and losing the 1999 final against Stonyhurst; they lost the 2008 final 19-0 to Sedbergh School.
The school's U15s reached the final of The Daily Mail Cup in the 2000/2001 season, losing to Epsom College. The school has rugby rivalries with Whitgift School, London Oratory School and Dulwich College. It is the only comprehensive school with a rugby fixture against Eton College.

Overall summary 1st XV

Overall summary U15A

The John Fisher Association
The JFA, a registered charity, was founded in 1996. Located at 33 Park Hill Carshalton, it was founded for the "advancement of the education of the pupils of The John Fisher School" and undertakes activities which contribute financially and socially to the school. The charity provide scholarships and bursaries during the school's selection policy.

Old Boys Association and alumni groups
The John Fisher Old Boys Association (JFOBA) is a members club for past pupils and teachers of The John Fisher School in Purley, Surrey. Membership is available to all former pupils of school, and those members and former members of the school's staff invited to be Honorary Members.

Notable former pupils

Arts and media
 Stefano Hatfield, newspaper editor
 Bill Nighy, actor 
 Matthew Wright, journalist and television presenter. Featured in I'm a Celebrity...Get Me Out Of Here!  in 2013
 Gilles Peterson, radio personality, DJ, and record label owner
 Diarmuid Byron O'Connor, sculptor
 Jack Scarisbrick, anti-abortion activist and Tudor historian

Business
 Tony Purnell, businessman (when the school was independent)

Military
 Eric de la Torre, MBE, veteran of the St Nazaire Raid

Science
 Professor Sir David Lane, cancer research scientist

Clergy
 Maurice Couve de Murville, Roman Catholic Archbishop of Birmingham

Sport
 Simon Hunt, England Sevens and Ebbw Vale Rugby Union player (during the selection policy)
 Tim and Chris Murtagh, Professional cricket players (both attended during the selection policy)
 Martyn Rooney, Beijing Olympics Team GB 400m finalist (During the selection policy)
 Paul Sackey, England (21 caps), London Wasps and RC Toulonnais Rugby Union player (during the selection policy)
 George Skivington, England Saxons and London Wasps Rugby Union player
 Franz Stampfl, Athletics coach - and coach to Roger Bannister, Chris Chataway and Chris Brasher
 Kyle Traynor, Scotland (three caps) and Edinburgh Rugby Club; also Scotland U18, 19, 21 (captain) (during the selection policy)
 Zane Scotland, PGA Tour golfer (during the selection policy)
 Walter D'Hondt, Olympic Rowing Gold Medalist
 Alistair Chay McKenzie, Rugby Union player (during the selection policy)
 Matt Williams, England 7s International and 1st XV player for Bristol Rugby
 Laurie Evans, cricketer; plays for Warwickshire County Cricket Club (during the selection policy)
 Matthew Leek, rugby union player (during the selection policy)
 Simon King, cricketer; played for Surrey County Cricket Club between 2006 and 2011
 Dan Leek, Rugby Union player (during the selection policy)
 Kieran Treadwell, Rugby Union, formerly of Harlequins, currently plays for Ulster Rugby and Ireland.
Alex Dombrandt, Rugby Union, Harlequins, winner of 2021 Rugby Premiership.
 Josh Umerah, Football, Professional player for Hartlepool United, formerly of Charlton Athletic, Kilmarnock and Wycombe Wanderers

See also
 Laleham Lea School

References

External links
 

Boys' schools in London
Educational institutions established in 1929
Secondary schools in the London Borough of Croydon
Formerly selective schools in the United Kingdom
Catholic secondary schools in the Archdiocese of Southwark
Voluntary aided schools in London
Catholic points-based admission school
1929 establishments in England